The Ornithological Society of Polynesia (French: Société d'Ornithologie de Polynésie), also known as Manu, a Polynesian word for "bird", is an environmental non-governmental organization dedicated to the conservation of birds and their habitats in Polynesia.  It was founded in July 1990 by bird enthusiasts in French Polynesia, for which it is the BirdLife International partner organisation.  Its emblem is the red-tailed tropicbird.

Activities
The Society publishes the quarterly French language bulletin Te Manu, which is sent to all members.  It is involved in surveys and conservation programs regarding the critically endangered Polynesian ground dove, Marquesan imperial pigeon, Tuamotu kingfisher, Tahiti monarch, Fatu Hiva monarch; the endangered Phoenix petrel, Tuamotu sandpiper, Marquesan ground dove, Polynesian imperial pigeon, Rimatara lorikeet, ultramarine lorikeet, Marquesan kingfisher, Marquesan monarch, as well as the blue lorikeet and Tahiti petrel.

See also
Pacific Islands Conservation Research Association

External links
 Manu

References

Notes

Sources
 
 

Animal welfare organizations based in French Polynesia
Bird conservation organizations
Ornithological organizations
Environment of French Polynesia
Environmental organizations established in 1990
1990 establishments in Oceania